Farnum is a surname that may refer to:

Billie S. Farnum (1916–1979), U.S. Representative and labor leader from Michigan
Dorothy Farnum (1900–1970), American screenwriter
Dustin Farnum (1874–1929), American singer, dancer and silent movie actor
E. B. Farnum (1826–?), first mayor of Deadwood, South Dakota
Franklyn Farnum (1878–1961), American character actor
Herbert Cyrus Farnum (1866–1926), American landscape painter
John Egbert Farnum (1824–1870), United States Army brevet brigadier general of volunteers
Kenneth Farnum (born 1931), Jamaican cyclist who competed in the 1952 Olympics
Mark Farnum (c. 1896–1957), All-American college football player
Marshall Farnum (1879–1917), American actor and film director
Royal B. Farnum (1884–1967), American art educator and President of the Rochester Institute of Technology
William Farnum (1876–1953), Hollywood film actor

See also
Farnum Fish (1896–1978), early American airplane pilot
Farnum House (disambiguation)
Farnum Block, a commercial building in Uxbridge, Massachusetts, on the National Register of Historic Places
Farnam (disambiguation)
Farnham (disambiguation)